Donato Mbuamangongo Malango Dyombe (born 1 August 1977) is an Equatorial Guinean former footballer who played as a midfielder. He represented the Equatorial Guinea national team.

Early life
Malango was born in Los Angeles, California, United States as a result of diplomatic work of his father. He moved with his family to Mozambique for two years and returned later to Equatorial Guinea, where Malango spent his infancy. Being a teenager, he emigrated to Spain.

Club career
Malango played for Spanish club Villaverde in the 1997-1998 season of the regional division of Madrid.

International career
On 8 June 2003 Malango (along with his brother Andrés) played for Equatorial Guinea, competing in a 2-1 win against Gabon at the 2004 Africa Cup of Nations qualifiers.

Personal life
Malango has two brothers, Thomas and Andrés, who were also footballers. They were also born in California. He now lives in Bicester, United Kingdom.

Statistics

International

References

1977 births
Living people
Citizens of Equatorial Guinea through descent
Equatoguinean footballers
Association football midfielders
Equatorial Guinea international footballers
Divisiones Regionales de Fútbol players
Equatoguinean expatriate footballers
Equatoguinean expatriate sportspeople in Spain
Expatriate footballers in Spain
American soccer players
Soccer players from Los Angeles
African-American soccer players
American people of Equatoguinean descent
American sportspeople of African descent
Sportspeople of Equatoguinean descent
American expatriate soccer players
American expatriate sportspeople in Spain
21st-century African-American sportspeople
20th-century African-American sportspeople